The following units and commanders of the U.S. and Spanish armies fought at the Siege of Santiago during the Spanish–American War from July 3 to July 17, 1898.

Abbreviations used

Military Rank
 Gen = General
 MG = Major General
 BG = Brigadier General
 Col = Colonel
 Ltc = Lieutenant Colonel
 Maj = Major
 Cpt = Captain
 Lt = 1st Lieutenant

Other
 w = wounded
 k = killed
 m = missing

U.S.
Commanding General of the United States Army - MG Nelson A. Miles arrived July 11

V Corps
MG William R. Shafter

General Staff
 Adjutant General: Ltc Edward J. McClernand
 Asst. Adjutant General: Capt James C. Gillmore
 Inspector General: Ltc John Jacob Astor IV

Headquarters
 1st Squadron, 2nd U.S. Cavalry: Maj William Rafferty
 Companies C & E, U.S. Engineers: Capt Edward Burr
 Signal Corps Detachment: Capt Smead

Cuban

Army of Liberation
Lieutenant General Calixto García

Insurgents: General Rabi
Insurgents: General Sanchez
Insurgents: General Capote
Insurgents: General Cebreco
Insurgents: General Lora
Insurgents: General Minet
Insurgents: General Castillo

(further composition unknown)

Spanish

IV Corps
Gen José Toral y Velázquez

See also
 San Juan Hill order of battle
 El Caney order of battle

References

Spanish-American War orders of battle